Mfulupinga Nlando Victor (15 December 1944 – 2 July 2004) was a member of the Angola National Assembly and a teacher of math. He was distinguished as founder of the political party PDP-ANA and President of the same. He died on 2 July 2004, the 60-year-old victim of assault, after being shot.

Biography 
Mfulupinga Nlandu Victor was born on 15 December 1944 in the municipality of Maquela do Zombo, Uige province, Angola. He was in exile in the then Congo Leopoldville due to colonial repression, devoting himself to his studies and mobilization of Angolan students outside the country, where later was elected president of the Angolan students in college Democratic Republic of the Congo.

He organized and directed the first congress of Angolan students in exile, which hosted about 500 participants from various continents, held in Kinshasa (DRC).

He returned to Angola after independence (1975), and belonged to the Interim Board of the Association.

Mfulupinga Victor created a focus group that came to culmination, on 17 March 1991, with the constitution of the PDP - ANA, where he served as president of the party.

He was a professor of Agostinho Neto University, where he taught mathematics and also held the positions of head of the mathematics department at the faculty of economics and head of the department of mathematics and engineering in the College of geographical sciences.

After founding the PDP - ANA, of which he served as president, he was elected deputy to the National Assembly in legislatures from 1992 to 1996 and from 1996 to 2004 was a member of the 6th Commission and the Council of the Republic.

Mfulupinga Nlandu Victor was killed on 2 July 2004 in Luanda, hours after attending a meeting of the Council of the Republic, organ who was a member of a group of elements hitherto unknown. He was hit by gunfire from a machine gun like AK, when he drove his expensive outside the headquarters of his party in the neighborhood of Cassenda, Maianga district.
The politician received treatment at the Clinic Endiama, the Luanda Island, where he eventually died.
The perpetrators fled with the vehicle's deputy.
The politician left a widow and five children.

References 

Angolan politicians
2004 deaths
1944 births